The Heimberger House is a historic house located at 653-655 West Vine Street in Springfield, Illinois. The two-family house was built in 1915; it was designed to resemble a single-family house to blend in with the surrounding neighborhood. Harry Jasper Reiger designed the Arts and Crafts style bungalow. The house has a characteristic low-pitched Craftsman roof with exposed rafters, wide eaves, and clipped gables. Skylights in the roof let natural light into the interior rooms, an uncommon feature for a Craftsman bungalow. The front porch is covered by a large half-timbered gable and features ornamental tiling.

The house was added to the National Register of Historic Places on April 21, 2014.

References

Houses on the National Register of Historic Places in Illinois
American Craftsman architecture in Illinois
National Register of Historic Places in Springfield, Illinois
Houses in Springfield, Illinois
Houses completed in 1915